Big Apple Academy is a coeducational independent school for students in pre-kindergarten through 8th grade. The academy occupies two modern facilities located in the Gravesend area of Brooklyn, New York City.

History
The Big Apple Academy takes its roots in the affiliated Bambi Academy, a Day Care Center founded by and oriented mostly towards Russian-speaking families.  Due to the success of the program, the faculty decided to expand the institution's goals.

In 1992 the first kindergarten class was opened, and the school matured into a large educational center – the Big Apple Academy. The school created its own curricula, developed new teaching methods, and purchased equipment.

Today, the Big Apple Academy includes curricula for kindergarten through 8th grade.

Departments
The Big Apple Academy comprises the following departments:
Mathematics Department
Social Studies and Science Department
English Language Department
Russian Language Department
Computer Science Department
Physical Education Department
Art Department

Admission
Admission decisions are based on an applicant's school records, entrance exams (English, Math), and a personal interview.

Curriculum
The curriculum is based on the standards of learning for K-12 NY schools by the New York State Department of Education, as well as those provided by various national pedagogical organizations.

Starting in kindergarten, children have 40-minute lessons with subject teachers in English, Math, Computer Science, Science, Social Studies, Art, Music, Russian Language and P.E., which includes swimming and standard athletic exercises.

In older grades the workload increases, and more advanced subjects are added. The students are taught Algebra, Geometry, Graphic Design, Computer Science, History and Geography as parts of Social Studies, and Physics, Chemistry, and Biology as parts of Science.

Terms
The school year consists of four terms:
  September through November
  December through January
  February through March
  April through June

Language
Instruction at Big Apple Academy is conducted in the English language. However, Russian language classes are also taught as a foreign language class. The class includes Comprehension, Writing, and Language Development. In K-grades bilingual (Russian-English) instruction is allowed for students who have recently entered the country and do not yet possess conversational skills. At parents’ request, additional Russian language lessons may be added to the existing scheduled ones. There are also Spanish and French clubs for students in the upper elementary (3rd grade to 5th grade).

Sports and academic clubs
Students of the Big Apple Academy can choose one or more clubs and after-school activities:

Sports clubs:
Swimming
Tennis
Tae Kwon Do

Academic clubs:
English
Spanish (3rd to 5th grades)
French (3rd to 5th grades)
Math
Science (3rd grade)

Art clubs:
Dance
Art (only for students gifted in art)

Transportation
Children are transported by school buses to and from the school. The boroughs of school bus coverage are Brooklyn, Queens and Staten Island.

References

External links
Big Apple Academy Official Website
Big Apple Academy Official Facebook Page
NYC Private School Focus on The Big Apple Academy Article in the NYC Private Schools Blog

Private elementary schools in Brooklyn
Private middle schools in Brooklyn
Private high schools in Brooklyn
Preparatory schools in New York City